The Last Letter Home is a novel by Vilhelm Moberg from 1959. It is the fourth and final part of The Emigrants series, the shortest book of the four, with a faster pace.

Plot
This novel tells about Karl-Oskar and Kristina in their late life and eventual death. The novel has a slightly more reflective perspective than the other three, and it follows events such as The American Civil War and the Sioux Outbreak of 1862 through the perspective of the settlers.

Film, television or theatrical adaptions
The New Land, a 1972 sequel to the first film, based on the last two novels.

1959 Swedish novels
Novels by Vilhelm Moberg
Historical novels
Novels set in the 1860s
Novels set during the American Civil War
Swedish-language novels
Novels about immigration to the United States
Works about Swedish-American culture